Indolent Records was a British record label established up in 1993 as a subsidiary of RCA Records and BMG. The label roster included Sleeper, The Wannadies, Stephen Duffy and 60ft Dolls. The label was folded into RCA Records in 1998.

See also
 List of record labels

References

Pop record labels
Rock record labels
RCA Records Music Group
Defunct record labels of the United Kingdom